Sadri is both a surname and a given name. Notable people with the name include:

Surname 

 Ahmad Sadri, Iranian sociologist
 Asghar Sadri (b. 1957), Iranian football player
 Hossein Sadri (b. 1979), Iranian architect
 John Sadri (b. 1956), American tennis player
 Mahmoud Sadri, Iranian sociologist
 Mohammad Sadri (b. 1963), Iranian film director

Given name 

 Sadri Ahmeti (1939–2010), Albanian painter and poet
 Sadri Alışık (1925–1995), Turkish film actor
 Sadri Gjonbalaj (b. 1966), Yugoslavian-American soccer forward
 Sadri Khiari (b. 1958), Tunisian activist
 Sadri Maksudi Arsal (1878–1957), Tatar and Turkish statesman, scholar and thinker